Antigua Caribbean Liberation Movement was a radical socialist and Pan-African political party in Antigua and Barbuda. ACLM was founded in 1968 by Tim Hector, the then chairman of the Progressive Labour Movement. The ideological inspiration for ACLM came from C.L.R. James.

Ideology 

ACLM had close contacts with Communist Party of Cuba and other leftist groups in the regions such as the New Jewel Movement of Grenada and favoured the creation of a Caribbean Union. The party also supported anti-Apartheid struggles in South Africa and organised African Liberation Day celebrations in Antigua.

Electoral strength 

In the 1980, elections, ACLM won no seats and its electoral strength never advanced much further.

Merger and dissolution 

UPP was formed in 1992, through a merger of ACLM, the Progressive Labour Movement and the United National Democratic Party. In February 2002, former ACLM and UPP member Alister Thomas announced that he had formed a new party, National Movement for Change.

External links 
Fan the Flame
News report from Hector's funeral
The Grenada Revolution Online: Leonard "Tim" Hector (1942–2002)
In Celebration of the Life of Tim Hector, Pan Africanist, Revolutionary
Article in Jamaica Observer
Marshall Consultancy Services, a company led by former ACLM general secretary Marshall

International opposition to apartheid in South Africa
Pan-Africanist political parties in the Caribbean
Defunct political parties in Antigua and Barbuda
Socialism in Antigua and Barbuda
Political parties established in 1968
1968 establishments in Antigua and Barbuda
Political parties disestablished in 1992
1992 disestablishments in Antigua and Barbuda